This list of American films of 1920 is a compilation of American films that were released in the year 1920.

A

B

C

D

E

F

G

H

I

J

K

L

M

N

O

P

R

S

T

U

V

W

Y

Serials

Shorts

See also 
 1920 in the United States

References

External links 

 1920 films at the Internet Movie Database

1920
Films
Lists of 1920 films by country or language
1920s in American cinema